Diesel Brothers is an American reality television series. The series premiered on January 4, 2016, on Discovery Channel. The program follows a group of friends in Utah who repair and customize pickup trucks.

Despite the name and physical resemblance to one another, the Diesel Brothers are not actually brothers. Friends David "Heavy D" Sparks and David "Diesel Dave" Kiley started a fix-it shop for all types of vehicles and brought in two other men as shop helpers. They posted various videos on YouTube, one of which led to an appearance on The Tonight Show With Jay Leno. Subsequently the Discovery Channel contacted the Diesel Brothers. 

On November 15, 2019, the series was renewed for a sixth season which premiered on December 9, 2019.

On July 16, 2020, it was announced that a three-hour TV special titled Diesel Brothers: Monster Jam Breaking World Records will premiere on August 8, 2020.

Lawsuit
In 2016, a Utah advocacy group called Utah Physicians for a Healthy Environment filed a civil lawsuit against the Diesel Brothers, alleging they engaged in "significant, repeated and ongoing violations of federal law" by modifying vehicles to create black smoke from the exhaust systems, which the group characterizes as "one of the most toxic types of pollution there is". The physicians group bought a modified truck from Sparks Motors, and independent testing confirmed that without required emissions features, the truck produced 36 times the pollutants and 21 times the particulate matter compared to a stock truck.

In June 2018, after hearing testimony from an emissions inspector based in Davis County, Utah that a Diesel Brothers truck had been illegally modified, a judge issued an injunction prohibiting any similar modifications in the future. Sparks stated he was modifying trucks only for off-road use under the belief it was legal and was working with the Environmental Protection Agency to ensure compliance.

In March 2020, three of the Diesel Brothers (Sparks, Keaton Hoskins and Joshua Stuart) and their various companies were fined a total of $850,000 after Federal Judge Robert J. Shelby determined they had violated the Clean Air Act on hundreds of occasions and also had violated the earlier injunction. The fine was less than the maximum possible, as Judge Shelby recognized various mitigating factors.

The Diesel Brothers filed an appeal in April 2020, with their attorney arguing the case fell under a split circuit with contradictory Federal rulings.

Episodes

Season 1 (2016)

Season 2 (2017)

Season 3 (2017)

Season 4 (2018)

Season 5 (2019)

Season 6 (2019)

References

External links

2010s American reality television series
2016 American television series debuts
Automotive television series
Discovery Channel original programming
Air pollution in the United States
Television shows set in Utah
2020s American reality television series